Bauchi Airport is an airport serving Bauchi in Nigeria. The former NE/SW runway is now used as a taxiway, and carries taxiway markings.

The IATA airport code has been transferred to the new airport.

See also
Transport in Nigeria
List of airports in Nigeria

References

External links
 Bauchi
 OpenStreetMap - Bauchi
 Google Earth

Airports in Nigeria